Pop Ćira i pop Spira ("priest Ćira and priest Spiro") is an 1894 novel by Stevan Sremac. The novel was adapted into film in Priests Ćira and Spira (1957).

Further reading

Serbian novels adapted into films
1894 novels
Serbian clergy
Fictional Serbian people
Characters in Serbian novels